The Ojibwe, Ojibwa, Chippewa, or Saulteaux are an Anishinaabe people in what is currently southern Canada, the northern Midwestern United States, and Northern Plains. They are Indigenous peoples of the Subarctic and Northeastern Woodlands.

According to the U.S. census, Ojibwe people are one of the largest tribal populations among Native American peoples in the United States. In Canada, they are the second-largest First Nations population, surpassed only by the Cree. They are one of the most numerous Indigenous Peoples north of the Rio Grande. The Ojibwe population is approximately 320,000 people, with 170,742 living in the United States , and approximately 160,000 living in Canada. In the United States, there are 77,940 mainline Ojibwe; 76,760 Saulteaux; and 8,770 Mississauga, organized in 125 bands. In Canada, they live from western Quebec to eastern British Columbia.

The Ojibwe language is Anishinaabemowin, a branch of the Algonquian language family.

They are part of the Council of Three Fires (which also include the Odawa and Potawatomi) and of the larger Anishinaabeg, which also include Algonquin, Nipissing, and Oji-Cree people. Historically, through the Saulteaux branch, they were a part of the Iron Confederacy with the Cree, Assiniboine, and Metis.

The Ojibwe are known for their birchbark canoes, birchbark scrolls, mining and trade in copper, as well as their cultivation of wild rice and maple syrup. Their Midewiwin Society is well respected as the keeper of detailed and complex scrolls of events, oral history, songs, maps, memories, stories, geometry, and mathematics.

European powers, Canada, and the United States have colonized Ojibwe lands. The Ojibwe signed treaties with settler leaders to surrender land for settlement in exchange for compensation, land reserves and guarantees of traditional rights. Many European settlers moved into the Ojibwe ancestral lands.

Etymology

The exonym for this Anishinaabe group is Ojibwe (plural: Ojibweg). This name is commonly anglicized as "Ojibwa" or "Ojibway". The name "Chippewa" is an alternative anglicization. Although many variations exist in the literature, "Chippewa" is more common in the United States, and "Ojibway" predominates in Canada, but both terms are used in each country. In many Ojibwe communities throughout Canada and the U.S. since the late 20th century, more members have been using the generalized name Anishinaabe(-g).

The meaning of the name Ojibwe is not known; the most common explanations for the name derivations are:
 ojiibwabwe (/o/ + /jiibw/ + /abwe/), meaning "those who cook/roast until it puckers", referring to their fire-curing of moccasin seams to make them waterproof. Some 19th century sources say this name described a method of ritual torture that the Ojibwe applied to enemies.
 ozhibii'iwe (/o/ + /zhibii'/ + /iwe/), meaning "those who keep records [of a Vision]", referring to their form of pictorial writing, and pictographs used in Midewiwin sacred rites; or
 ojiibwe (/o/ + /jiib/ + /we/), meaning "those who speak stiffly" or "those who stammer", an exonym or name given to them by the Cree, who described the Ojibwe language for its differences from their own.

Because many Ojibwe were formerly located around the outlet of Lake Superior, which the French colonists called Sault Ste. Marie for its rapids, the early Canadian settlers referred to the Ojibwe as Saulteurs. Ojibwe who subsequently moved to the prairie provinces of Canada have retained the name Saulteaux. This is disputed since some scholars believe that only the name migrated west. Ojibwe who were originally located along the Mississagi River and made their way to southern Ontario are known as the Mississaugas.

Language

The Ojibwe language is known as Anishinaabemowin or Ojibwemowin, and is still widely spoken, although the number of fluent speakers has declined sharply. Today, most of the language's fluent speakers are elders. Since the early 21st century, there is a growing movement to revitalize the language and restore its strength as a central part of Ojibwe culture. The language belongs to the Algonquian linguistic group and is descended from Proto-Algonquian. Its sister languages include Blackfoot, Cheyenne, Cree, Fox, Menominee, Potawatomi, and Shawnee among the northern Plains tribes. Anishinaabemowin is frequently referred to as a "Central Algonquian" language; Central Algonquian is an area grouping, however, rather than a linguistic genetic one.

Ojibwemowin is the fourth-most spoken Native language in North America after Navajo, Cree, and Inuktitut. Many decades of fur trading with the French established the language as one of the key trade languages of the Great Lakes and the northern Great Plains.

The popularity of the epic poem The Song of Hiawatha, written by Henry Wadsworth Longfellow in 1855, publicized the Ojibwe culture. The epic contains many toponyms that originate from Ojibwe words.

History

Precontact and spiritual beliefs
According to Ojibwe oral history and from recordings in birch bark scrolls, the Ojibwe originated from the mouth of the Saint Lawrence River on the Atlantic coast of what is now Quebec. They traded widely across the continent for thousands of years as they migrated, and knew of the canoe routes to move north, west to east, and then south in the Americas. The identification of the Ojibwe as a culture or people may have occurred in response to contact with Europeans. The Europeans preferred to deal with groups, and tried to identify those they encountered.

According to Ojibwe oral history, seven great miigis (Cowrie shells) appeared to them in the Waabanakiing (Land of the Dawn, i.e., Eastern Land) to teach them the mide way of life. One of the miigis was too spiritually powerful and killed the people in the Waabanakiing when they were in its presence. The six others remained to teach, while the one returned into the ocean. The six established doodem (clans) for people in the east, symbolized by animals. The five original Anishinaabe doodem were the Wawaazisii (Bullhead), Baswenaazhi (Echo-maker, i.e., Crane), Aan'aawenh (Pintail Duck), Nooke (Tender, i.e., Bear) and Moozoonsii (Little Moose). The six miigis then returned to the ocean as well. If the seventh had stayed, it would have established the Thunderbird doodem.

At a later time, one of these miigis appeared in a vision to relate a prophecy. It said that if the Anishinaabeg did not move farther west, they would not be able to keep their traditional ways alive because of the many new pale-skinned settlers who would arrive soon in the east. Their migration path would be symbolized by a series of smaller Turtle Islands, which was confirmed with miigis shells (i.e., cowry shells). After receiving assurance from their "Allied Brothers" (i.e., Mi'kmaq) and "Father" (i.e., Abenaki) of their safety to move inland, the Anishinaabeg gradually migrated west along the Saint Lawrence River to the Ottawa River to Lake Nipissing, and then to the Great Lakes.

The first of the smaller Turtle Islands was Mooniyaa, where Mooniyaang (present-day Montreal)  developed. The "second stopping place" was in the vicinity of the Wayaanag-gakaabikaa (Concave Waterfalls, i.e., Niagara Falls). At their "third stopping place", near the present-day city of Detroit, Michigan, the Anishinaabeg divided into six groups, of which the Ojibwe was one.

The first significant new Ojibwe culture-center was their "fourth stopping place" on Manidoo Minising (Manitoulin Island). Their first new political-center was referred to as their "fifth stopping place", in their present country at Baawiting (Sault Ste. Marie).
Continuing their westward expansion, the Ojibwe divided into the "northern branch", following the north shore of Lake Superior, and the "southern branch", along its south shore.

As the people continued to migrate westward, the "northern branch" divided into a "westerly group" and a "southerly group". The "southern branch" and the "southerly group" of the "northern branch" came together at their "sixth stopping place" on Spirit Island located in the Saint Louis River estuary at the western end of Lake Superior. (This has since been developed as the present-day Duluth/Superior cities.) The people were directed in a vision by the miigis being to go to the "place where there is food (i.e., wild rice) upon the waters." Their second major settlement, referred to as their "seventh stopping place", was at Shaugawaumikong (or Zhaagawaamikong, French, Chequamegon) on the southern shore of Lake Superior, near the present La Pointe, Wisconsin.

The "westerly group" of the "northern branch" migrated along the Rainy River, Red River of the North, and across the northern Great Plains until reaching the Pacific Northwest. Along their migration to the west, they came across many miigis, or cowry shells, as told in the prophecy.

Contact with Europeans

The first historical mention of the Ojibwe occurs in the French Jesuit Relation of 1640, a report by the missionary priests to their superiors in France. Through their friendship with the French traders (coureurs des bois and voyageurs), the Ojibwe gained guns, began to use European goods, and began to dominate their traditional enemies, the Lakota and Fox to their west and south. They drove the Sioux from the Upper Mississippi region to the area of the present-day Dakotas, and forced the Fox down from northern Wisconsin. The latter allied with the Sauk for protection.

By the end of the 18th century, the Ojibwe controlled nearly all of present-day Michigan, northern Wisconsin, and Minnesota, including most of the Red River area. They also controlled the entire northern shores of lakes Huron and Superior on the Canadian side and extending westward to the Turtle Mountains of North Dakota. In the latter area, the French Canadians called them Ojibwe or Saulteaux.

The Ojibwe were part of a long-term alliance with the Anishinaabe Odawa and Potawatomi peoples, called the Council of Three Fires. They fought against the Iroquois Confederacy, based mainly to the southeast of the Great Lakes in present-day New York, and the Sioux to the west. The Ojibwa stopped the Iroquois advance into their territory near Lake Superior in 1662. Then they formed an alliance with other tribes such as the Huron and the Odawa who had been displaced by the Iroquois invasion. Together they launched a massive counterattack against the Iroquois and drove them out of Michigan and southern Ontario until they were forced to flee back to their original homeland in upstate New York. At the same time the Iroquois were subjected to attacks by the French. This was the beginning of the end of the Iroquois Confederacy as they were put on the defensive. The Ojibwe expanded eastward, taking over the lands along the eastern shores of Lake Huron and Georgian Bay.

In 1745, they adopted guns from the British in order to repel the Dakota people in the Lake Superior area, pushing them to the south and west. In the 1680s the Ojibwa defeated the Iroquois who dispersed their Huron allies and trading partners. This victory allowed them a "golden age" in which they ruled uncontested in southern Ontario.

Often, treaties known as "peace and friendship treaties" were made to establish community bonds between the Ojibwe and the European settlers. These established the groundwork for cooperative resource-sharing between the Ojibwe and the settlers. The United States and Canada viewed later treaties offering land cessions as offering territorial advantages. The Ojibwe did not understand the land cession terms in the same way because of the cultural differences in understanding the uses of land. The governments of the U.S. and Canada considered land a commodity of value that could be freely bought, owned and sold. The Ojibwe believed it was a fully shared resource, along with air, water and sunlight—despite having an understanding of "territory". At the time of the treaty councils, they could not conceive of separate land sales or exclusive ownership of land. Consequently, today, in both Canada and the U.S., legal arguments in treaty-rights and treaty interpretations often bring to light the differences in cultural understanding of treaty terms to come to legal understanding of the treaty obligations.

In part because of its long trading alliance, the Ojibwe allied with the French against Great Britain and its colonists in the Seven Years' War (also called the French and Indian War). After losing the war in 1763, France was forced to cede its colonial claims to lands in Canada and east of the Mississippi River to Britain. After Pontiac's War and adjusting to British colonial rule, the Ojibwe allied with British forces and against the United States in the War of 1812. They had hoped that a British victory could protect them against United States settlers' encroachment on their territory.

Following the war, the United States government tried to forcibly remove all the Ojibwe to Minnesota, west of the Mississippi River. The Ojibwe resisted, and there were violent confrontations. In the Sandy Lake Tragedy, several hundred Ojibwe died because of the federal government's failure to deliver fall annuity payments.  The government attempted to do this in the Keweenaw Peninsula in the Upper Peninsula of Michigan. Through the efforts of Chief Buffalo and the rise of popular opinion in the U.S. against Ojibwe removal, the bands east of the Mississippi were allowed to return to reservations on ceded territory. A few families were removed to Kansas as part of the Potawatomi removal.

In British North America, the Royal Proclamation of 1763 following the Seven Years' War governed the cession of land by treaty or purchase . Subsequently, France ceded most of the land in Upper Canada to Great Britain. Even with the Jay Treaty signed between Great Britain and the United States following the American Revolutionary War, the newly formed United States did not fully uphold the treaty. As it was still preoccupied by war with France, Great Britain ceded to the United States much of the lands in Ohio, Indiana, Michigan, parts of Illinois and Wisconsin, and northern Minnesota and North Dakota to settle the boundary of their holdings in Canada.

In 1807, the Ojibwe joined three other tribes, the Odawa, Potawatomi and Wyandot people, in signing the Treaty of Detroit. The agreement, between the tribes and William Hull, representing the Michigan Territory, gave the United States a portion of today's Southeastern Michigan and a section of Ohio near the Maumee River. The tribes were able to retain small pockets of land in the territory.

The Battle of the Brule was an October 1842 battle between the La Pointe Band of Ojibwe Indians and a war party of Dakota Indians. The battle took place along the Brule River (Bois Brûlé) in what is today northern Wisconsin and resulted in a decisive victory for the Ojibwe.

In Canada, many of the land cession treaties the British made with the Ojibwe provided for their rights for continued hunting, fishing and gathering of natural resources after land sales. The government signed numbered treaties in northwestern Ontario, Manitoba, Saskatchewan, and Alberta. British Columbia had not signed treaties until the late 20th century, and most areas have no treaties yet. The government and First Nations are continuing to negotiate treaty land entitlements and settlements. The treaties are constantly being reinterpreted by the courts because many of them are vague and difficult to apply in modern times. The numbered treaties were some of the most detailed treaties signed for their time. The Ojibwe Nation set the agenda and negotiated the first numbered treaties before they would allow safe passage of many more British settlers to the prairies.

Ojibwe communities have a strong history of political and social activism. Long before contact, they were closely aligned with Odawa and Potawatomi people in the Council of the Three Fires. From the 1870s to 1938, the Grand General Indian Council of Ontario attempted to reconcile multiple traditional models into one cohesive voice to exercise political influence over colonial legislation. In the West, 16 Plains Cree and Ojibwe bands formed the Allied Bands of Qu'Appelle in 1910 in order to redress concerns about the failure of the government to uphold Treaty 4's promises.

Culture

The Ojibwe have traditionally organized themselves into groups known as bands. Most Ojibwe, except for the Great Plains bands, have historically lived a settled (as opposed to nomadic) lifestyle, relying on fishing and hunting to supplement the cultivation of numerous varieties of maize and squash, and the harvesting of manoomin (wild rice) for food. Historically their typical dwelling has been the wiigiwaam (wigwam), built either as a waginogaan (domed-lodge) or as a nasawa'ogaan (pointed-lodge), made of birch bark, juniper bark and willow saplings. In the contemporary era, most of the people live in modern housing, but traditional structures are still used for special sites and events.

They have a culturally-specific form of pictorial writing, used in the religious rites of the Midewiwin and recorded on birch bark scrolls and possibly on rock. The many complex pictures on the sacred scrolls communicate much historical, geometrical, and mathematical knowledge. The use of petroforms, petroglyphs, and pictographs has been common throughout the Ojibwe traditional territories. Petroforms and medicine wheels have been used to teach important spiritual concepts, record astronomical events, and to use as a mnemonic device for certain stories and beliefs. The script is still in use, among traditional people as well as among youth on social media.

Some ceremonies use the miigis shell (cowry shell), which is found naturally in distant coastal areas. Their use of such shells demonstrates there is a vast, longstanding trade network across the continent. The use and trade of copper across the continent has also been proof of a large trading network that took place for thousands of years, as far back as the Hopewell tradition. Certain types of rock used for spear and arrow heads have also been traded over large distances precontact.

During the summer months, the people attend jiingotamog for the spiritual and niimi'idimaa for a social gathering (powwows) at various reservations in the Anishinaabe-Aki (Anishinaabe Country). Many people still follow the traditional ways of harvesting wild rice, picking berries, hunting, making medicines, and making maple sugar.

The Ojibwe bury their dead in burial mounds. Many erect a jiibegamig or a "spirit-house" over each mound. An historical burial mound would typically have a wooden marker, inscribed with the deceased's doodem (clan sign). Because of the distinct features of these burials, Ojibwe graves have been often looted by grave robbers. In the United States, many Ojibwe communities safe-guard their burial mounds through the enforcement of the 1990 Native American Graves Protection and Repatriation Act.

Several Ojibwe bands in the United States cooperate in the Great Lakes Indian Fish & Wildlife Commission, which manages the treaty hunting and fishing rights in the Lake Superior-Lake Michigan areas. The commission follows the directives of U.S. agencies to run several wilderness areas. Some Minnesota Ojibwe tribal councils cooperate in the 1854 Treaty Authority, which manages their treaty hunting and fishing rights in the Arrowhead Region. In Michigan, the Chippewa-Ottawa Resource Authority manages the hunting, fishing and gathering rights about Sault Ste. Marie, and the resources of the waters of lakes Michigan and Huron. In Canada, the Grand Council of Treaty No. 3 manages the Treaty 3 hunting and fishing rights related to the area around Lake of the Woods.

Cuisine

There is renewed interest in nutritious eating among the Ojibwe, who have been expanding community gardens in food deserts, and have started a mobile kitchen to teach their communities about nutritious food preparation. The traditional Native American diet was seasonally dependent on hunting, fishing and the foraging and farming of produce and grains. The modern diet has substituted some other types of food like frybread and "Indian tacos" in place of these traditionally prepared meals. The Native Americans loss of connection to their culture is part of the "quest to reconnect
to their food traditions" sparking an interest in traditional ingredients like wild rice, that is the official state grain of Minnesota and was part of the pre-colonial diet of the Ojibwe. Other staple foods of the Ojibwe were fish, maple sugar, venison and corn. They grew beans, squash, corn and potatoes and foraged for blueberries, blackberries, choke cherries, raspberries, gooseberries and huckleberries. During the summer game animals like deer, beaver, moose, goose, duck, rabbits and bear were hunted.

One traditional method of making granulated sugar known among the Anishinabe was to boil maple syrup until reduced and pour into a trough, where the rapidly cooling syrup was quickly processed into maple sugar using wooden paddles.

Kinship and clan system

Traditionally, the Ojibwe had a patrilineal system, in which children were considered born to the father's clan. For this reason, children with French or English fathers were considered outside the clan and Ojibwe society unless adopted by an Ojibwe male. They were sometimes referred to as "white" because of their fathers, regardless if their mothers were Ojibwe, as they had no official place in the Ojibwe society. The people would shelter the woman and her children, but they did not have the same place in the culture as children born to Ojibwe fathers.

Ojibwe understanding of kinship is complex and includes the immediate family as well as extended family. It is considered a modified bifurcate merging kinship system. As with any bifurcate-merging kinship system, siblings generally share the same kinship term with parallel cousins because they are all part of the same clan. The modified system allows for younger siblings to share the same kinship term with younger cross-cousins. Complexity wanes further from the person's immediate generation, but some complexity is retained with female relatives. For example, ninooshenh is "my mother's sister" or "my father's sister-in-law"—i.e., my parallel-aunt, but also "my parent's female cross-cousin". Great-grandparents and older generations, as well as great-grandchildren and younger generations, are collectively called aanikoobijigan. This system of kinship reflects the Anishinaabe philosophy of interconnectedness and balance among all living generations, as well as of all generations of the past and of the future.

The Ojibwe people were divided into a number of doodemag (clans; singular: doodem) named primarily for animals and birds totems (pronounced doodem). The word in the Ojibwe language means "my fellow clansman." The five original totems were Wawaazisii (Bullhead), Baswenaazhi ("Echo-maker", i.e., Crane), Aan'aawenh (Pintail Duck), Nooke ("Tender", i.e., Bear) and Moozwaanowe ("Little" Moose-tail). The Crane totem was the most vocal among the Ojibwe, and the Bear was the largest – so large, that it was sub-divided into body parts such as the head, the ribs and the feet. Each clan had certain responsibilities among the people. People had to marry a spouse from a different clan.

Traditionally, each band had a self-regulating council consisting of leaders of the communities' clans, or odoodemaan. The band was often identified by the principal doodem. In meeting others, the traditional greeting among the Ojibwe people is, "What is your 'doodem'?" ("Aaniin gidoodem?" or "Awanen gidoodem?") The response allows the parties to establish social conduct by identifying as family, friends or enemies. Today, the greeting has been shortened to "Aanii (pronounced "Ah-nee").

Spiritual beliefs

The Ojibwe have spiritual beliefs that have been passed down by oral tradition under the Midewiwin teachings. These include a creation story and a recounting of the origins of ceremonies and rituals. Spiritual beliefs and rituals were very important to the Ojibwe because spirits guided them through life. Birch bark scrolls and petroforms were used to pass along knowledge and information, as well as for ceremonies. Pictographs were also used for ceremonies.

The sweatlodge is still used during important ceremonies about the four directions, when oral history is recounted. Teaching lodges are common today to teach the next generations about the language and ancient ways of the past. The traditional ways, ideas, and teachings are preserved and practiced in such living ceremonies.

The modern dreamcatcher, adopted by the Pan-Indian Movement and New Age groups, originated in the Ojibwe "spider web charm", a hoop with woven string or sinew meant to replicate a spider's web, used as a protective charm for infants. According to Ojibwe legend, the protective charms originate with the Spider Woman, known as Asibikaashi; who takes care of the children and the people on the land and as the Ojibwe Nation spread to the corners of North America it became difficult for Asibikaashi to reach all the children, so the mothers and grandmothers wove webs for the children, which had an apotropaic purpose and were not explicitly connected with dreams.

Funeral practices

Traditional 
In Ojibwe tradition, the main task after a death is to bury the body as soon as possible, the very next day or even on the day of death. This was important because it allowed the spirit of the dead to journey to its place of joy and happiness. The land of happiness where the dead reside is called Gaagige Minawaanigozigiwining. This was a journey that took four days. If burial preparations could not be completed the day of the death, guests and medicine men were required to stay with the deceased and the family in order to help mourn, while also singing songs and dancing throughout the night. Once preparations were complete, the body would be placed in an inflexed position with their knees towards their chest. Over the course of the four days it takes the spirit to journey to its place of joy, it is customary to have food kept alongside the grave at all times. A fire is set when the sun sets and is kept going throughout the night. The food is to help feed the spirit over the course of the journey, while the smoke from the fire is a directional guide. Once the four day journey is over, a feast is held, which is led by the chief medicine man. At the feast, it is the chief medicine man's duty to give away certain belongings of the deceased. Those who were chosen to receive items from the deceased are required to trade in a new piece of clothing, all of which would be turned into a bundle. The bundle of new cloths and a dish is then given to the closest relative. The recipient of the bundle must then find individuals that he or she believes to be worthy, and pass on one of the new pieces of clothing.

Contemporary 
According to Lee Staples, an Ojibwe spiritual leader from the Mille Lacs Indian Reservation, present day practices follow the same spiritual beliefs and remain fairly similar. When an individual dies, a fire is lit in the home of the family, who are also expected to continuously maintain the fire for four days. Over the four days, food is also offered to the spirit. Added to food offerings, tobacco is also offered as it is considered one of four sacred medicines traditionally used by Ojibwe communities. On the last night of food offerings, a feast is also held by the relatives which ends with a final smoke of the offering tobacco or the tobacco being thrown in the fire. Although conventional caskets are mainly used in today's communities, birch bark fire matches are buried along with the body as a tool to help light fires to guide their journey to Gaagige Minawaanigozigiwining.

Ethnobotany

Plants used by the Ojibwe include Agrimonia gryposepala, used for urinary problems, and Pinus strobus, the resin of which was used to treat infections and gangrene. The roots of Symphyotrichum novae-angliae are smoked in pipes to attract game. Allium tricoccum is eaten as part of Ojibwe cuisine. They also use a decoction as a quick-acting emetic. An infusion of the alba subspecies of Silene latifolia is used as physic. The South Ojibwa use a decoction of the root Viola canadensis for pains near the bladder. The Ojibwa are documented to use the root of Uvularia grandiflora for pain in the solar plexus, which may refer to pleurisy. They take a compound decoction of the root of Ribes glandulosum for back pain and for "female weakness".

The Ojibwe eat the corms of Sagittaria cuneata for indigestion, and also as a food, eaten boiled fresh, dried or candied with maple sugar. Muskrat and beavers store them in large caches, which they have learned to recognize and appropriate. They take an infusion of the Antennaria howellii ssp. neodioica after childbirth to purge afterbirth and to heal. They use the roots of Solidago rigida, using a decoction of root as an enema and take an infusion of the root for "stoppage of urine". They use Abies balsamea; melting the gum on warm stones and inhaling the fumes for headache. They also use a decoction of the root as an herbal steam for rheumatic joints. They also combine the gum with bear grease and use it as an ointment for hair. They use the needle-like leaves in as part of ceremony involving the sweatbath, and use the gum for colds and inhale the leaf smoke for colds. They use the plant as a cough medicine. The gum is used for sores and a compound containing leaves is used as wash. The liquid balsam from bark blisters is used for sore eyes.  They boil the resin twice and add it to suet or fat to make a canoe pitch. The bark gum is taken for chest soreness from colds, applied to cuts and sores, and decoction of the bark is used to induce sweating. The bark gum is also taken for gonorrhea.   A decoction (tea) of powdered, dried Onoclea sensibilis root is used to stimulate milk flow in female patients.

Bands

In his History of the Ojibway People (1855), William W. Warren recorded 10 major divisions of the Ojibwe in the United States. He mistakenly omitted the Ojibwe located in Michigan, western Minnesota and westward, and all of Canada. When identified major historical bands located in Michigan and Ontario are added, the count becomes 15:

These 15 major divisions developed into the following Ojibwe Bands and First Nations of today. Bands are listed under their respective tribes where possible. See also the listing of Saulteaux communities.

 Aamjiwnaang First Nation
 Aroland First Nation
 Batchewana First Nation of Ojibways
 Bay Mills Indian Community
 Biinjitiwabik Zaaging Anishnabek First Nation
 Burt Lake Band of Chippewa and Ottawa Indians
 Caldwell First Nation
 Chapleau Ojibway First Nation
 Chippewas of Kettle and Stony Point
 Chippewas of Lake Simcoe and Huron (Historical)
 Beausoleil First Nation
 Chippewas of Georgina Island First Nation
 Chippewas of Rama First Nation (formerly known as Chippewas of Mnjikaning First Nation)
 Chippewas of Nawash Unceded First Nation
 Chippewa of the Thames First Nation
 Chippewas of Saugeen Ojibway Territory (Historical)
 Chippewas of Nawash Unceded First Nation
 Saugeen First Nation
 Chippewa Cree Tribe of Rocky Boys Indian Reservation
 Curve Lake First Nation
 Cutler First Nation
 Dokis First Nation
 Eabametoong First Nation
 First Nation of Ojibwe California
 Fort William First Nation
 Grand Traverse Band of Ottawa and Chippewa Indians
 Garden River First Nation
 Henvey Inlet First Nation
 Grassy Narrows First Nation (Asabiinyashkosiwagong Nitam-Anishinaabeg)
 Islands in the Trent Waters
 Keeseekoowenin Ojibway First Nation (also known as Riding Mountain Band)
 Koocheching First Nation
 Lac des Mille Lacs First Nation
 Lac La Croix First Nation
 Lac Seul First Nation
 Lake Nipigon Ojibway First Nation
 Lake Superior Chippewa Tribe
 Bad River Chippewa Band
 Lac Vieux Desert Band of Lake Superior Chippewa
 Keweenaw Bay Indian Community
 L'Anse Band of Chippewa Indians
 Ontonagon Band of Chippewa Indians
 Lac Courte Oreilles Band of Lake Superior Chippewa Indians
 Bois Brule River Band of Lake Superior Chippewa
 Chippewa River Band of Lake Superior Chippewa
 Lac Courte Oreilles Band of Lake Superior Chippewa Indians
 Removable St. Croix Chippewa Indians of Wisconsin
 Lac du Flambeau Band of Lake Superior Chippewa
 Red Cliff Band of Lake Superior Chippewa
 Sokaogon Chippewa Community
 St. Croix Chippewa Indians of Wisconsin
 Little Shell Tribe of Chippewa Indians of Montana
 Little Traverse Bay Bands of Odawa Indians
 Mackinac Bands of Chippewa and Ottawa Indians
 Magnetawan First Nation
 Minnesota Chippewa Tribe
 Bois Forte Band of Chippewa
 Bois Forte Band of Chippewa
 Lake Vermilion Band of Lake Superior Chippewa
 Little Forks Band of Rainy River Saulteaux
 Fond du Lac Band of Lake Superior Chippewa
 Grand Portage Band of Chippewa
 Leech Lake Band of Ojibwe
 Cass Lake Band of Chippewa
 Lake Winnibigoshish Band of Chippewa
 Leech Lake Band of Pillagers
 Removable Lake Superior Bands of Chippewa of the Chippewa Reservation
 White Oak Point Band of Mississippi Chippewa
 Pokegama Lake Band of Mississippi Chippewa
 Removable Sandy Lake Band of Mississippi Chippewa
 Mille Lacs Band of Ojibwe
 Mille Lacs Indians
 Sandy Lake Band of Mississippi Chippewa
 Rice Lake Band of Mississippi Chippewa
 St. Croix Band of Chippewa Indians of Minnesota
 Kettle River Band of Chippewa Indians
 Snake and Knife Rivers Band of Chippewa Indians
 White Earth Band of Chippewa
 Gull Lake Band of Mississippi Chippewa
 Otter Tail Band of Pillagers
 Rabbit Lake Band of Mississippi Chippewa
 Removable Mille Lacs Indians
 Rice Lake Band of Mississippi Chippewa
 Mississaugi First Nation
 North Caribou Lake First Nation
 Ojibway Nation of Saugeen First Nation
 Ojibways of the Pic River First Nation
 Osnaburg House Band of Ojibway and Cree (Historical)
 Cat Lake First Nation
 Mishkeegogamang First Nation (formerly known as New Osnaburgh First Nation)
 Slate Falls First Nation
 Pembina Band of Chippewa Indians (Historical)
 Pikangikum First Nation
 Poplar Hill First Nation
 Red Lake Band of Chippewa Indians
 Lac des Bois Band of Chippewa Indians
 Rolling River First Nation
 Sagamok Anishnawbek First Nation
 Saginaw Chippewa Tribal Council
 Sault Tribe of Chippewa Indians
 Saulteaux First Nation
 Shawanaga First Nation
 Southeast Tribal Council
 Berens River First Nation
 Bloodvein First Nation
 Brokenhead First Nation
 Buffalo Point First Nation (Saulteaux)
 Hollow Water First Nation
 Black River First Nation
 Little Grand Rapids First Nation
 Pauingassi First Nation (Saulteaux)
 Poplar River First Nation
 Turtle Mountain Band of Chippewa Indians
 Wabaseemoong Independent Nation
 Wabauskang First Nation
 Wabun Tribal Council
 Beaverhouse First Nation
 Brunswick House First Nation
 Chapleau Ojibwe First Nation
 Matachewan First Nation
 Mattagami First Nation
 Wahgoshig First Nation
 Wabigoon Lake Ojibway Nation
 Wahnapitae First Nation
 Walpole Island First Nation
 Washagamis Bay First Nation
 Whitefish Bay First Nation
 Whitefish Lake First Nation
 Whitefish River First Nation
 Whitesand First Nation
 Whitewater Lake First Nation
 Wikwemikong Unceded First Nation

Notable Ojibwe people

Ojibwe people from the 20th and 21st centuries should be listed under their specific tribes.

 Francis Assikinack (1824–1863), historian from Manitoulin Island
 Stephen Bonga, Ojibwe/African-American fur trader and interpreter
 George Bonga (1802–1880), Ojibwe/African-American fur trader and interpreter
 Jeanne L'Strange Cappel (1873–1949), writer, teacher and clubwoman
 Hanging Cloud, 19th c. Lac Courte Oreilles Ojibwe woman warrior
 George Copway (1818–1869), missionary and writer
 Margaret Bonga Fahlstrom (c.1797–1880), Ojibwe-African American woman in the early Methodist Episcopal Church in Minnesota
 Cara Gee (1983–), Canadian actress
 Fr. Philip B. Gordon (1885–1948), Roman Catholic priest and activist from Gordon, Wisconsin
 Hole in the Day (1825–1868), Chief of the Mississippi Band of the Minnesota Ojibwe
 Michael Hudson (born 1939), economics professor
 Peter Jones (1802–1856), Mississauga missionary and writer
 Kechewaishke (Gichi-Weshkiinh, Buffalo) (ca. 1759–1855), chief
 Edmonia Lewis (ca. 1844–1907), Mississauga Ojibwe/African-American sculptor
 Trixie Mattel (1989–), American drag queen
 Maungwudaus, (1811–1888), performer, interpreter, mission worker, and herbalist
 Medweganoonind, 19th-century Red Lake Ojibwe chief
 T. J. Oshie (1986-), American professional ice hockey player and Stanley Cup champion. 
 Ozaawindib (Yellow Head), early 19th c. nonbinary warrior, guide
 Keewaydinoquay Peschel (1919–1999), teacher, ethnobotanist
 Chief Rocky Boy (fl. late 19th c.), chief
 Jane Johnston Schoolcraft (1800–1842), author, wife of Henry Rowe Schoolcraft, born in Sault Ste. Marie
 John Smith (ca. 1824–1922, chief, from Cass Lake, Minnesota
 Alfred Michael "Chief" Venne (1879–1971), athletic manager and coach from Leroy, North Dakota
 Waabaanakwad (White Cloud) (ca. 1830-1898), Gull Lake chief
 William Whipple Warren (1825–1853), first historical writer of the Ojibwe people, territorial legislator
 Zheewegonab (fl. 1780–1805), band leader among the northern Ojibwe

Ojibwe treaties
 Chippewa Ottawa Resource Authority—1836CT fisheries
 Grand Council of Treaty 3—Treaty 3
 Grand Council of Treaty 8—Treaty 8
 Great Lakes Indian Fish & Wildlife Commission—1837CT, 1836CT, 1842CT and 1854CT
 Nishnawbe Aski Nation—Treaty 5 and Treaty 9
 Red Lake Band of Chippewa—1886CT and 1889CT
 Union of Ontario Indians—RS, RH1, RH2, misc. pre-confederation treaties

 Treaties with France
 La Grande Paix de Montréal (1701)

 Treaties with Great Britain and the United Kingdom

 Treaty of Fort Niagara (1764)
 Treaty of Fort Niagara (1781)
 Indian Officers' Land Treaty (1783)
 The Crawford Purchases (1783)
 Between the Lakes Purchase (1784)
 Treaty of Peace with Sioux, Chippewa and Winnebago (1787)
 Toronto Purchase (1787)
 Indenture to the Toronto Purchase (1805)
 The McKee Purchase (1790)
 Between the Lakes Purchase (1792)
 Chenail Ecarte (Sombra Township) Purchase (1796)
 London Township Purchase (1796)
 Land for Joseph Brant (1797)
 Penetanguishene Bay Purchase (1798)
 St. Joseph Island (1798)
 Head-of-the-Lake Purchase (1806)
 Lake Simcoe-Lake Huron Purchase (1815)
 Lake Simcoe-Nottawasaga Purchase (1818)
 Ajetance Purchase (1818)
 Rice Lake Purchase (1818)
 The Rideau Purchase (1819)
 Long Woods Purchase (1822)
 Huron Tract Purchase (1827)
 Saugeen Tract Agreement (1836)
 Manitoulin Agreement (1836)
 The Robinson Treaties
 Ojibewa Indians of Lake Superior (1850)
 Ojibewa Indians of Lake Huron (1850)
 Manitoulin Island Treaty (1862)

 Treaties with Canada

 Treaty No. 1 (1871)—Stone Fort Treaty
 Treaty No. 2 (1871)
 Treaty No. 3 (1873)—Northwest Angle Treaty
 Treaty No. 4 (1874)—Qu'Appelle Treaty
 Treaty No. 5 (1875)
 Treaty No. 6 (1876)
 Treaty No. 8 (1899)
 Treaty No. 9 (1905–1906)—James Bay Treaty
 Treaty No. 5, Adhesions (1908–1910)
 The Williams Treaties (1923)
 The Chippewa Indians
 The Mississauga Indians
 Treaty No. 9, Adhesions (1929–1930)

 Treaties with the United States

 Treaty of Fort McIntosh (1785)
 Treaty of Fort Harmar (1789)
 Treaty of Greenville (1795)
 Fort Industry (1805)
 Treaty of Detroit (1807)
 Treaty of Brownstown (1808)
 Treaty of Springwells (1815)
 Treaty of St. Louis (1816)—Ottawa, Ojibwe, and Potawatomi
 Treaty of Miami Rapids (1817)
 Treaty of St. Mary's (1818)
 Treaty of Saginaw (1819)
 Treaty of Saúlt Ste. Marie (1820)
 Treaty of L'Arbre Croche and Michilimackinac (1820)
 Treaty of Chicago (1821)
 First Treaty of Prairie du Chien (1825)
 Treaty of Fond du Lac (1826)
 Treaty of Butte des Morts (1827)
 Treaty of Green Bay (1828)
 Second Treaty of Prairie du Chien (1829)
 Treaty of Chicago (1833)
 Treaty of Washington (1836)—Ottawa & Chippewa
 Treaty of Washington (1836)—Swan Creek & Black River Bands
 Treaty of Detroit (1837)
 Treaty of St. Peters (1837)—White Pine Treaty
 Treaty of Flint River (1837)
 Saganaw Treaties
 Treaty of Saganaw (1838)
 Supplemental Treaty (1839)
 Treaty of La Pointe (1842)—Copper Treaty
 Isle Royale Agreement (1844)
 Treaty of Potawatomi Creek (1846)
 Treaty of Fond du Lac (1847)
 Treaty of Leech Lake (1847)
 Treaty of La Pointe (1854)
 Treaty of Washington (1855)
 Treaty of Detroit (1855)—Ottawa & Chippewa
 Treaty of Detroit (1855)—Sault Ste. Marie Band
 Treaty of Detroit (1855)—Swan Creek & Black River Bands
 Treaty of Sac and Fox Agency (1859)
 Treaty of Washington (1863)
 Treaty of Old Crossing (1863)
 Treaty of Old Crossing (1864)
 Treaty of Washington (1864)
 Treaty of Isabella Reservation (1864)
 Treaty of Washington (1866)
 Treaty of Washington (1867)

Gallery

See also
 Amikwa people
 First Nations
 Timeline of First Nations history
 History of Native Americans in the United States
 Native Americans in the United States

References

Notes

Bibliography
 
 H. Hickerson, The Chippewa and Their Neighbors (1970)
 R. Landes, Ojibwa Sociology (1937, repr. 1969)
 R. Landes, Ojibwa Woman (1938, repr. 1971)
 
 F. Symington, The Canadian Indian (1969)

Further reading
 Aaniin Ekidong: Ojibwe Vocabulary Project. St. Paul: Minnesota Humanities Center, 2009
 
 Bento-Banai, Edward (2004). Creation- From the Ojibwa. The Mishomis Book.
 Child, Brenda J. (2014). My Grandfather's Knocking Sticks: Ojibwe Family Life and Labor on the Reservation. St. Paul, MN: Minnesota Historical Society Press.
 Danziger, E.J., Jr. (1978). The Chippewa of Lake Superior. Norman: University of Oklahoma Press.
 Denial, Catherine J. (2013). Making Marriage: Husbands, Wives, and the American State in Dakota and Ojibwe Country. St. Paul, MN: Minnesota Historical Society Press.
 Densmore, F. (1979). Chippewa customs. St. Paul: Minnesota Historical Society Press. (Published originally 1929)
 Grim, J.A. (1983). The shaman: Patterns of religious healing among the Ojibway Indians. Norman: University of Oklahoma Press.
 Gross, L.W. (2002). The comic vision of Anishinaabe culture and religion. American Indian Quarterly, 26, 436–459.
 Howse, Joseph. A Grammar of the Cree Language; With which is combined an analysis of the Chippeway dialect. London: J.G.F. & J. Rivington, 1844.
 Johnston, B. (1976). Ojibway heritage. Toronto: McClelland and Stewart.
 Long, J. Voyages and Travels of an Indian Interpreter and Trader Describing the Manners and Customs of the North American Indians, with an Account of the Posts Situated on the River Saint Laurence, Lake Ontario, & C., to Which Is Added a Vocabulary of the Chippeway Language ... a List of Words in the Iroquois, Mehegan, Shawanee, and Esquimeaux Tongues, and a Table, Shewing the Analogy between the Algonkin and the Chippeway Languages. London: Robson, 1791.
 Nichols, J.D., & Nyholm, E. (1995). A concise dictionary of Minnesota Ojibwe. Minneapolis: University of Minnesota Press.
 Treuer, Anton. Everything You Wanted to Know About Indians But Were Afraid to Ask. St. Paul: Minnesota Historical Society Press, 2012.
 Treuer, Anton. The Assassination of Hole in the Day. St. Paul: Minnesota Historical Society Press, 2011.
 Treuer, Anton. Ojibwe in Minnesota. St. Paul: Minnesota Historical Society, 2010. Ojibwe in Minnesota. St. Paul: Minnesota Historical Society Press, 2010.
 Treuer, Anton. Living Our Language: Ojibwe Tales & Oral Histories. St. Paul: Minnesota Historical Society Press, 2001.
 Vizenor, G. (1972). The everlasting sky: New voices from the people named the Chippewa. New York: Crowell-Collier Press.
 Vizenor, G. (1981). Summer in the spring: Ojibwe lyric poems and tribal stories. Minneapolis: The Nodin Press.
 Vizenor, G. (1984). The people named the Chippewa: Narrative histories. Minneapolis: University of Minnesota Press.
 Warren, William W. (1851). History of the Ojibway People.
 White, Richard (1991). The Middle Ground: Indians, Empires, and Republics in the Great Lakes Region, 1650–1815 (Studies in North American Indian History) Cambridge University Press, Cambridge, England.
 White, Richard (July 31, 2000). Chippewas of the Sault. The Sault Tribe News.
 Wub-e-ke-niew. (1995). We have the right to exist: A translation of aboriginal indigenous thought. New York: Black Thistle Press.

External links

 Ojibwe Song Pictures, recorded by Frances Desmore
 Ojibwe People's Dictionary
 Ojibwe Waasa-Inaabidaa—PBS documentary featuring the history and culture of the Anishinaabe-Ojibwe people of the Great Lakes (United States–focused).
 Ojibwe migratory map from Ojibwe Waasa-Inaabidaa
 Batchewana First Nation of Ojibways
 Red Cliff Band of Lake Superior Chippewa
 Mississaugi First Nation
 Southeast Tribal Council
 Wabun Tribal Council
 Ojibwe Stories: Gaganoonididaa from the Public Radio Exchange

 
Algonquian ethnonyms
Algonquian peoples
Anishinaabe groups
Anishinaabe lands
First Nations in Alberta
First Nations in Manitoba
First Nations in Ontario
First Nations in Quebec
First Nations in Saskatchewan
Great Lakes tribes
Indigenous peoples of the Northeastern Woodlands
Native American tribes in Michigan
Native American tribes in Minnesota
Native American tribes in Montana
Native American tribes in North Dakota
Native American tribes in Wisconsin
Native American tribes
Plains tribes
Upper Peninsula of Michigan